Svetlin Roussev is a Bulgarian-born violinist. He was accepted to the Paris Conservatory at the age of 15, where he studied with Devy Erlih and Jean-Jacques Kantorow. He was the winner of the first Sendai International Music Competition in 2001. Since 2017, he has been a professor at the Geneva University of Music.

Discography
 2019: "Midnight Bells"
2015: "Fire & Ice: Sibelius & Vladigerov Violin Concertos

References 

Bulgarian violinists
Conservatoire de Paris alumni
21st-century Bulgarian musicians
People from Ruse, Bulgaria
21st-century violinists

Year of birth missing (living people)
Living people